The second season of Mayans M.C., an American crime drama, premiered on FX, on September 3, 2019, and concluded on November 5, 2019. The second season consisted of ten episodes and aired on Tuesdays in the United States on FX. Mayans M.C. is an American crime drama television series created by Kurt Sutter and Elgin James. The show takes place in the same fictional universe as Sons of Anarchy, and deals with the Sons' rivals-turned-allies, the Mayans Motorcycle Club.

Production
In October 2018, it was announced that FX had renewed the series for a second season. In August 2019, series co-creator and executive producer Kurt Sutter announced that he would leave the series if it was renewed for a third season. Sutter said: "It's time for the white man to leave the building." In October 2019, Sutter was removed from his position as co-showrunner on Mayans M.C. while its second season was still airing. Sutter believes that his jokes about Disney after the Disney-Fox merger is what led to his dismissal.

Casting
Series co-creator Kurt Sutter had expressed interest in bringing in more characters from Mayans predecessor Sons of Anarchy.

Cast and characters

Main
 J. D. Pardo as Ezekiel "EZ" Reyes, prospect for the Mayans and brother to Angel Reyes.
 Clayton Cardenas as Angel Reyes, EZ's brother and Él Secretario of Mayans M.C., Santo Padre Charter 
 Sarah Bolger as Emily Thomas, childhood sweetheart of EZ, who is now married to Miguel Galindo, and the mother of their infant son.
 Michael Irby as Obispo "Bishop" Losa, president of Mayans M.C.'s Santo Padre Charter. 
 Carla Baratta as Adelita, who as a child, watched her family die at the hands of the Galindo cartel.
 Richard Cabral as Johnny "El Coco" Cruz, a full patch member of Mayans M.C.
 Raoul Trujillo as Che "Taza" Romero, Vice Presidente of Mayans M.C., Santo Padre Charter. 
 Antonio Jaramillo as Michael "Riz" Ariza, a full patch member of Mayans M.C.
 Danny Pino as Miguel Galindo, the son of Galindo Cartel founder Jose Galindo.
 Edward James Olmos as Felipe Reyes, the once-strong Mexican patriarch and Angel and EZ's father.
 Emilio Rivera as Marcus Álvarez, Consejero to Miguel Galindo, former president of the Mayans M.C. Oakland Charter and national president of the Mayans M.C., cousin of Obispo "Bishop" Losa

Special guests
 David Labrava as Happy Lowman, SAMCRO Sergeant-at-Arms, who is responsible for the death of EZ and Angel's mother.
 Robert Patrick as Les Packer, SAMDINO President.
 Tommy Flanagan as Filip "Chibs" Telford, SAMCRO President.
 Jacob Vargas as Allesandro Montez, the SAMCRO Road Captain.
 Rusty Coones as Rane Quinn, member of SAMCRO.

Recurring
 Ray McKinnon as Lincoln Potter, reprising his role from Sons of Anarchy. 
 Ada Maris as Dita Galindo, Miguel's mother and Jose Galindo's widow.
 Gino Vento as Nestor Oceteva, Miguel's chief of security.
 Edwin Hodge as Officer Franky Rogan.
 Michael Ornstein as Chuck "Chucky" Marstein, reprising his role from Sons of Anarchy.
 Frankie Loyal Delgado as Hank "El Tranq" Loza, Sergeant-at-Arms / El Pacificador of the Mayans M.C.
 Efrat Dor as Katrina, Lincoln's assistant
 Ivo Nandi as Oscar "El Oso" Ramos, reprising his role from Sons of Anarchy.
 Malaya Rivera Drew as Ileana, an old friend of Emily now working for the city council.
 Mía Maestro as Sederica Palomo, a Mexican politician.

Episodes

Reception

Critical response
The second season received positive reviews from critics. On the review aggregation website Rotten Tomatoes, the season currently holds a perfect 100% approval rating with an average rating of  7.75 out of 10 based on 5 reviews.

Ratings

Notes

References

External links
 
 

2019 American television seasons
Sons of Anarchy